Mahiravana is a 1940 Indian Telugu-language film directed by Chitrapu Narayana Rao and produced by Ghantasala Balaramayya under the banner of Kubera Films. Veteran actor Vemuri Gaggayya played Ahiravan.

Mairavana turned out to be big hit because of its technical values. The directorial involvement with trick photography (Govindrao Bhadsavle) and opulent sets (T. V. S. Sarma) supported by the make-up (Mangayya) have contributed greatly to its success.

Plot
The film is based on the story of Ahiravan, who ruled the lower world Pathala. Ravana kept Sita in captivity. War ensues with the involvement of Vanaras. His wife Mandodari pleads to him to release Sita. She also warns him not to have enmity with Lord Rama. Ravana refuses to heed the advice and seeks the help of Mahi Ravana to kill Rama and Lakshmana. Anjaneya builds a fortress using his tail to safeguard them. But Mahi Ravana, using his mystical powers, brings them to Pathala Loka. Pathala Queen Devi Bandini is a devotee of Lord Rama and wishes to marry him. Rama kills Mahi Ravana with her help and promises to marry her in future generations.

Cast
 Vemuri Gaggayya as Ahiravan
 Kanchanamala as Chandrasena
 Rami Reddy
 Rayaprolu Subrahmanyam as Ravana
 T. Ramakrishna Sastry as Lord Rama
 Y. R. Suri as Anjaneya
 G. Seshachalam as Lakshmana
 K. Subrahmanya Kumari
 Nellore Krishnaiah as Matsyavallabha

1964 film
The film was remade in 1964 by B. A. Subba Rao. It starred Kanta Rao as Rama, Relangi as Anjaneya, Sobhan Babu as Lakshmana, Dhoolipala as Mairavana and Krishna Kumari as Chandrasena. S. Rajeswara Rao gave the music.

References

External links
 Mahiravana 1940 film at IMDb.

1940 films
1940s Telugu-language films
Indian black-and-white films
Indian musical drama films
1940s musical drama films
Films based on the Ramayana
Films directed by Chitrapu Narayana Rao
1940 drama films
Films scored by Gali Penchala Narasimha Rao